Richard Marable (born March 23, 1949) is an American politician who served in the Georgia State Senate from the 52nd district from 1991 to 2003.

References

1949 births
Living people
Democratic Party Georgia (U.S. state) state senators